VC Belogorie Belgorod is a Russian professional volleyball club based in Belgorod, which is participating in the Russian Volleyball Super League. VC Belogorie won the Russian Championship and the Russian Cup eight times each. The club is also a three-times CEV Champions League champion.

Achievements
International competitions
FIVB Club World Championship
Winners (1):  2014
 CEV Champions League
Winners (3):  2003, 2004, 2014
Third place (2):  2005, 2006
 CEV Cup
Winners (2):  2009, 2018
Third place (1):  1997
 CEV Challenge Cup
Winners (1):  2019
Runners-up (1):  2002
Domestic competitions
Russian Super League 
Winners (8):   1997, 1998, 2000, 2002, 2003, 2004, 2005, 2013
Runners-up (6):  1995, 1996, 1999, 2006, 2010, 2015
Third place (3):  2011, 2014, 2016
Russian Cup
Winners (8):  1995, 1996, 1997, 1998, 2003, 2005, 2012, 2013
Runners-up (1): 2015
Russian SuperCup
Winners (2):  2013, 2014

Former names

Team Roster
Team roster – season 2021/2022

References

External links
Official website

Lokomotiv-Belogorie
Lokomotiv-Belogorie

Volleyball clubs established in 1976